The 5th New York State Legislature, consisting of the New York State Senate and the New York State Assembly, met from October 10, 1781, to April 14, 1782, during the fifth year of George Clinton's governorship, at Poughkeepsie.

Background
Under the provisions of the New York Constitution of 1777, the State Senators were elected on general tickets in the senatorial districts, and were then divided into four classes. Six senators each drew lots for a term of 1, 2, 3 or 4 years and, beginning at the election in April 1778, every year six Senate seats came up for election to a four-year term. Assemblymen were elected countywide on general tickets to a one-year term, the whole assembly being renewed annually.

On May 8, 1777, the Constitutional Convention had appointed the senators from the Southern District, and the assemblymen from Kings, New York, Queens, Richmond and Suffolk counties—the area which was under British control—and determined that these appointees serve in the Legislature until elections could be held in those areas, presumably after the end of the American Revolutionary War. Vacancies among the appointed members in the Senate should be filled by the Assembly, and vacancies in the Assembly by the Senate.

Elections
The State elections were held from April 24 to 26, 1781. Under the determination by the Constitutional Convention, Senator Sir James Jay, whose seat was up for election, continued in office, as well as the assemblymen from Kings, New York, Queens, Richmond and Suffolk counties. Levi Pawling (Middle D.) and Alexander Webster (Eastern D.) were re-elected. John Haring (Middle D.), and ex-assemblymen Henry Oothoudt and William B. Whiting (Western D.) were also elected to the Senate. Ex-Assemblyman Thomas Palmer was elected in the Middle District to fill the vacancy caused by the expulsion of Ephraim Paine.

Sessions
The State Legislature met in Poughkeepsie, the seat of Dutchess County. The Senate met first on October 10, 1781, the Assembly on October 24; the Senate adjourned on November 3, the Assembly on November 23. The Assembly reconvened on February 21, 1782, the Senate on February 23; and both Houses adjourned on April 14. The seat of Sir James Jay was declared vacant when he joined the Loyalists, and at the end of the American Revolutionary War he went into exile in London.

State Senate

Districts
The Southern District (9 seats) consisted of Kings, New York, Queens, Richmond, Suffolk and Westchester counties.
The Middle District (6 seats) consisted of Dutchess, Orange and Ulster counties.
The Eastern District (3 seats) consisted of Charlotte, Cumberland and Gloucester counties.
The Western District (6 seats) consisted of Albany and Tryon counties.

Note: There are now 62 counties in the State of New York. The counties which are not mentioned in this list had not yet been established, or sufficiently organized, the area being included in one or more of the abovementioned counties. In 1784, Charlotte Co. was renamed Washington Co., and Tryon Co. was renamed Montgomery Co.

Senators
The asterisk (*) denotes members of the previous Legislature who continued in office as members of this Legislature.

Employees
Clerk: Robert Benson

State Assembly

Districts

The City and County of Albany (10 seats)
Charlotte County (4 seats)
Cumberland County (3 seats)
Dutchess County (7 seats)
Gloucester County (2 seats)
Kings County (2 seats)
The City and County of New York (9 seats)
Orange County (4 seats)
Queens County (4 seats)
Richmond County (2 seats)
Suffolk County (5 seats)
Tryon County (6 seats)
Ulster County (6 seats)
Westchester County (6 seats)

Note: There are now 62 counties in the State of New York. The counties which are not mentioned in this list had not yet been established, or sufficiently organized, the area being included in one or more of the abovementioned counties. In 1784, Charlotte Co. was renamed Washington Co., and Tryon Co. was renamed Montgomery Co.

Assemblymen
The asterisk (*) denotes members of the previous Legislature who continued as members of this Legislature.

Employees
Clerk: John McKesson

Notes

Sources
The New York Civil List compiled by Franklin Benjamin Hough (Weed, Parsons and Co., 1858) [see pg. 108 for Senate districts; pg. 111f for senators; pg. 148f for Assembly districts; pg. 160 for assemblymen]

1781 in New York (state)
1782 in New York (state)
005